Events in the year 1915 in Japan. It corresponds to Taishō 4 (大正4年) in the Japanese calendar.

Incumbents
Emperor: Taishō
Prime Minister: Ōkuma Shigenobu

Governors
Aichi Prefecture: Matsui Shigeru
Akita Prefecture: Saburo Sakamoto 
Aomori Prefecture: Matsujiro Obama 
Ehime Prefecture: Renarto Fukamachi 
Fukui Prefecture: Sato Kozaburo 
Fukushima Prefecture: Ota Masahiro (until 1 April); Sukeji Horiguchi (starting 1 April)
Gifu Prefecture: Shimada Gotaro 
Gunma Prefecture: Miyake Gennosuke 
Hiroshima Prefecture: Terada Yushi 
Hyogo Prefecture: Seino Chotarno (starting month unknown)
Ibaraki Prefecture: Keisuke Sakanaka 
Ishikawa Prefecture: Kiichirō Kumagai then Ōta Masahiro 
Iwate Prefecture: Rinpei Otsu
Kagawa Prefecture: Takeji Kawamura (until 9 January); Raizo Wakabayashi (starting 9 January)
Kanagawa Prefecture: Chūichi Ariyoshi (starting month unknown)
Kochi Prefecture: Toki Kahei 
Kumamoto Prefecture: Kawakami Shinhare 
Kyoto Prefecture: Shoichi Omori 
Mie Prefecture: Eitaro Mabuchi
Miyagi Prefecture: Magoichi Tahara (until 12 August); Tsunenosuke Hamada (starting 12 August)
Miyazaki Prefecture: Tadakazu Ariyoshi (until 12 August); Shutaro Horiuchi (starting 12 August)
Nagano Prefecture: Yuichiro Chikaraishi (until 12 August); Tenta Akaboshi (starting 12 August)
Niigata Prefecture: Keisuke Sakanaka 
Okinawa Prefecture: Kyūgorō Ōmi
Osaka Prefecture: Marques Okubo Toshi Takeshi 
Saga Prefecture: Raizo Wakabayashi (until 8 January); Ishibashi Kazu (starting 8 January)
Saitama Prefecture: Akira Masaya 
Shiname Prefecture: Ichiro Oriharami 
Tochigi Prefecture: Shin Kitagawa 
Tokyo: Kubota Kiyochika (until 2 July); Yuichi Ionue (until 2 July)
Toyama Prefecture: Tsunenosuke Hamada (until 12 August); Ki Masesaku (starting 12 August)
Yamagata Prefecture: Iwataro Odakiri

Events
 January 18 – Twenty-One Demands from Japan to China are made.
 March unknown date – A tool brand, Makita founded, as predecessor name was Makita Electronics Manufacturing. 
 March 25 – 1915 Japanese general election: The Rikken Dōshikai party emerged as the largest party in the House of Representatives, winning 153 of the 381 seats. The 381 members of the House of Representatives were elected in 51 multi-member constituencies based on prefectures and cities. Voting was restricted to men aged over 25 who paid at least 10 yen a year in direct taxation.
May 18 – Toshiko, Princess Yasu, ninth daughter of Emperor Meiji, marries Prince Naruhiko Higashikuni
September 1 – Yokogawa Electric was founded.
November 10 – Enthronement of Taishō as the Emperor of Japan in the Imperial Palace in Kyoto. Originally scheduled to be held in 1914 (Taisho 3, 大正3年), it was postponed for one year in April of the same year due to the death of Empress Shōken.
November Unknown date – Azuma Kogyo, as predecessor of Teijin, founded in Yonezawa, Yamagata Prefecture.
December 9–14 – Sankebetsu brown bear incident: was the worst bear attack in Japanese history, killing seven settlers in Rokusensawa, Sankebetsu, Tomamae, Rumoi, Hokkaidō, Japan.
Ōura scandal
Tapani incident
Ongoing – Japan during World War I

Births
January 4 – Michiko Kuwano, actress (d. 1946)
January 20 – Masanori Yusa, freestyle swimmer (d. 1975)
February 15 – Haruo Umezaki, writer (d. 1965)
February 20 – Takiko Mizunoe, actress, film producer, and radio and TV presenter (d. 2009)
February 28 – Nobuo Kojima, writer and author (d. 2006)
May 15 – Shozo Makino, swimmer (d. 1987)
October 17 – Taiji Tonoyama, actor (d. 1989)
November 20 – Kon Ichikawa, film director (d. 2008)
December 2 – Takahito, Prince Mikasa, youngest son of Emperor Taishō (d. 2016)
December 25 – Yumeko Aizome, actress

Deaths
January 12 – Arisaka Nariakira, Lieutenant general and inventor of the Arisaka rifle (b. 1852)
August 5 – Sakuma Samata, politician and Governor of Taiwan (b. 1844)
September 1 – Inoue Kaoru, politician (Genrō) (b. 1836)
September 4 – Goseda Yoshimatsu, artist (b. 1855)
September 26 – Tsuruko Haraguchi, psychologist and the first Japanese woman to receive a Doctor of Philosophy (b. 1886)
September 28 – Saitō Hajime, samurai of the late Edo period, captain of the third unit of the Shinsengumi (b. 1844)
November 28 – Kobayashi Kiyochika, ukiyo-e artist (b. 1847)

See also
List of Japanese films of the 1910s
Asian and Pacific theatre of World War I

References

 
1910s in Japan